GPS meteorology refers to the use of the effect of the atmosphere on the
propagation of the Global Positioning System's (GPS) radio signals to derive
information on the state of the (lower, neutral) atmosphere.

There are currently two main operational techniques in use in GPS meteorology:
GPS limb sounding from orbit, and GPS water vapour monitoring.

Ground-based 
As a result, if it is possible to determine the total atmospheric delay by GPS,
one can subtract out the calculated contribution by the well-mixed "dry" gasses
from the measured air pressure at the surface, and obtain a measure for the
absolute water vapour content of the atmosphere, integrated from surface to
space. This is also referred to as "total precipitable water vapour".

What makes it possible to determine the total atmospheric delay, is its known
dependence of the zenith or elevation angle of the satellite. If 
is the zenith angle, the propagation path delay is proportional to
. This unique signature makes it possible to solve
separately for the zenith delay in GPS computations also solving for
station coordinates and receiver clock delays.

Nowadays water vapour estimates are generated routinely in real time (latency
measured in hours) by permanent geodetic GPS networks existing in
many parts of the world.

Water vapour is a very important gas for meteorological and climatological
studies, because of the latent heat it carries in transport. Additionally
it is a powerful greenhouse gas.  The GPS technique is especially valuable
because it measures absolute water vapour content or partial pressure
rather than relative humidity, which corresponds to water vapour contents that
are strongly dependent on the often not precisely known temperature.

Space-based 

One can receive on a low flying satellite the signals from the much higher
orbiting (20 000 km) GPS satellite constellation. As the low flying satellite
orbits the Earth in 1.5 hours, many of the GPS satellites will "rise" and "set"
during the time of the orbit. When they do, their signal will traverse the atmosphere.

A signal delay is produced which grows or decays exponentially with time, just
as the atmospheric density is an exponential function of height above the
Earth's surface. In fact, this so-called limb sounding technique allows
us to determine the scale height, the constant describing the steepness of
this atmospheric density decay. This makes the technique extremely valuable for
climatological studies, as the scale height is directly related to the
temperature in the upper atmosphere, where the limb sounding signals do their
sensing. The technique works best in the lower stratosphere and upper
troposphere; it breaks down close to the Earth surface especially in the
tropics, due to water vapour extinction.

Satellites involved in GPS limb sounding have been: METSAT, OERSTED (Danish),
and several others.

See also
Error analysis for the Global Positioning System

Links and references 

 GPS meteorology

Meteorological instrumentation and equipment
Global Positioning System